René Laubies (1917–2006) was a Colonial French painter, translator, traveler and writer associated with the Lyrical Abstraction, Arte Informale and Tachism movements though particularly linked to the Nuagisme (Cloudism) painters.

Laubies was born in Cholon in the Imperial French Colony of Cochin-china to a well-off family. His father was Réunionnaise French-Colonial. His mother was of solid Sinitic roots from a line of upland Phu-Ly Dynasty of Annamese Mandarins.

Laubies was the recipient of the coveted Fénéon Prize for visual art in 1954. He collaborated with American poet Robert Creeley.

Laubies died in India on 13 November 2006.

References

External links
Cloutier, Guy. N.d. Untitled document. http://guycloutier.org/Laubies.htm.
On Rene Laubies. Clouds, 23.7.07.
Problematization in Laubies Work. Clouds, 14.3.09.

20th-century births
2006 deaths
20th-century French painters
20th-century French male artists
French male painters
21st-century French painters
21st-century French male artists
Art Informel and Tachisme painters
Prix Fénéon winners
Vietnamese emigrants to France